The modern pentathlon men's team event of the 1960 Summer Olympics was held on August 26, through to August 31. The modern pentathlon was composed of five events, show jumping, fencing, shooting, swimming, and running, with the individual points each competitor receives counting towards their nations final tally for each event, and ultimately the competition. The results that the competitors received in the individual modern pentathlon event would cross-over to produce the scores in the team event. 51 competitors participated in the event representing 17 nations.

Format

The Riding event commenced on August 26 at Passo Corese. The event was an equestrian cross-country mix steeplechase race. 20 minutes before the event, the competitors were paired with their horses that they would ride through a random draw. The points the competitors received from the event were given based on the time it took to complete the course. The competitors would receive a penalty for whenever they knocked over one of the obstacles, these penalties would be subtracted from the riders final total, giving them their 'adjusted points'.

The Fencing event commenced on August 27 at the Palazzo dei Congressi. The event was contested as a single touch épée round-robin style tournament. Each contestant would receive points for every bout they won, their points would accumulate for every win.

The Shooting event commenced on August 28 at Umberto I Shooting Range. The event was contested as a 200 shot, rapid fire pistol contest. The points for each competitor in the event was given as a result of the score they received from their targets. If a competitor didn't receive a high enough score, they wouldn't gain any points from the contest.

The Swimming event commenced on August 30 at the Stadio Olimpico del Nuoto. The event was contested as a 300-metre freestyle swim. The points the competitors received were based on the time it took them to complete the race.

The Running event commenced on August 31 at the Acqua Santa Golf Club Course. The event was contested as a 4,000 metre cross country race. The points the competitors received were based on the time it took them to complete the race.

Results

Final standings

References

1960 Summer Olympics events
1960
Modern pentathlon at the 1960 Summer Olympics